OutWit Hub is a Web data extraction software application designed to automatically extract information from online or local resources. It recognizes and grabs links, images, documents, contacts, recurring vocabulary and phrases, rss feeds and converts structured and unstructured data into formatted tables which can be exported to spreadsheets or databases. The first version was released in 2010. Version 9.0 was released in January 2020.

The program includes a Mozilla-based browser and a side bar which gives access to a number of views with pre-set extractors. Web pages and textual documents are broken down into their different constituents, presented as tables in these views. The application can navigate through series of links and sequences of search engine results pages to extract information elements, organize them in tables and export them to various formats. The predefined extractors allow to collect structured tables, lists or feeds. Custom scrapers can also be created to extract data from less structured page elements. Regular expressions can be included in scrapers as well as in other parts of the application to define variable recognition markers.

Although OutWit Hub is presented as a tool for non-technical users, the fact that the application doesn't use the document object model structure for its extractions prevents visual "point & grab" data scraping and forces the user who wants to create custom scrapers to define markers in the source code of the page. The advantage of this approach, however, is that it allows a more precise definition of extraction masks than HTML nodes and faster execution, as the document object model tree doesn't need to be rendered by the browser at extraction time.

Versions 
A limited free version can be downloaded from the publisher's site and shareware download websites.

Features 
 Recognition and extraction of links, email addresses, structured & non-structured data, RSS news
 Extraction & download of images and documents
 Extraction of text, with dictionary of words & groups of words by frequency
 Automated browsing with user-defined Web exploration rules
 Automatic query and URL generation by patterns
 Directories of links & queries
 Custom scrapers
 Macro automation
 Periodical job execution

Advanced features 
An Enterprise edition of the application includes advanced extraction and automation features for specific or large volume extractions, sending series of automatically generated HTTP or POST queries and uploading scraped data to FTP servers.

Browser extensions

Firefox
OutWit Hub is a discontinued Firefox extension.

See also
 Data driven journalism
 Web scraping

Similar Tools 
 yahoo pipes
 Automation Anywhere - Web extractor and automation system
Octatools.com

References

External links 
http://www.outwit.com/

Data processing
Web crawlers
Nonfree Firefox legacy extensions